Engdahl is a surname, meaning ‘meadow (äng) valley (dahl)’, and may refer to:

 Emma Engdahl-Jägerskiöld (1852-1930), Finnish opera singer
 F. William Engdahl (born 1944), American economist and writer
 Horace Engdahl (born 1948), Swedish literary historian and critic
 J. Louis Engdahl (1884-1932), American radical journalist
 Nils Engdahl (1898-1983), Swedish athlete
 Per Engdahl (1909-1994), Swedish Neo-Nazi politician
 Sylvia Engdahl (born 1933), American science fiction writer

See also 
Engberg
Englund

Swedish-language surnames